Fritz Ganz (20 February 1916 – 31 March 1992) was a Swiss cyclist and politician. He competed in the tandem event at the 1936 Summer Olympics. From 1971 till 1983 he was member of the Swiss parliament.

References

External links
 

1916 births
1992 deaths
Swiss male cyclists
Olympic cyclists of Switzerland
Cyclists at the 1936 Summer Olympics
Cyclists from Zürich